Laili also Mare Laili was a mare warhorse belonging to Maharaja Ranjit Singh of Sikh Empire (Punjab). He fought the Afghan war with Sultan Mohammad Shah for the horse, sacrificing 12000 men and spending 60 lakhs. Maharaja Ranjit Singh was fond of horses, he risked the lives of Raja Sher Singh and General Ventura for the sake of Laili.

References 

Individual warhorses
Sikh Empire
Individual mares